Naranja is a Spanish word meaning 'orange fruit' and can refer to:

 Naranja, Florida, a census-designated place
 Renato Naranja (born 1940), International Master of chess from the Philippines
 Naranja, one of the two academies in Pokémon Scarlet and Violet

See also
 "Arbolito de Naranja", a traditional song sung by children in Ecuador
 Automeris naranja, a species of moth
 La Gente Naranja, an Ecuadorian rock en español band
 Mi Media Naranja, a 1997 studio album by Labradford
 Naranja-Princeton, Florida, a former census-designated place
 Naranjas de Villa Clara, a Cuban baseball club
 Naranjo (disambiguation)
 Polygrammodes naranja, a species of moth
 Postplatyptilia naranja, a species of moth
 Vino de naranja, a Spanish white wine macerated with orange peel
 

Surnames of Spanish origin